Mamajuana is a Dominican band assembled by the Dominican composer and producer Eddy González

.

Mamajuana combines Afro-Caribbean and contemporary rhythms with romantic lyrics. Their self-titled debut album

, released by Sony International, featured the hit singles "Mamasota" and "Sin Un Beso Suyo". After two weeks in the U.S. market, Mamajuana sold 20,000 copies.

Mamajuana was the first Dominican merengue band to ever perform in China, they had a season at the Venetian Macau Casino and Sands Hotel and Casino; Mamajuana was nominated to Premios Lo Nuestro (Univision) as best tropical group or duo in the 2002 awards, also was Revelacion del 2002 in Casandra Awards (Dominican Republic) and pre-nominated to the 2004 Grammy Awards for the best Urban Album for For Sale.

In the year 2017, Eddy Gonzalez reformed the band and start performing with a new music style and concept that he describe as "Electronica Tropical"

, which combines the electronic music with latin and tropical beats.

Sources

External links
Official site
Mamajuana discography

Dominican Republic musical groups
Merengue music groups